Mikal Safiyullah (born Mark Richardson; 1968), better known by his stage name Divine Styler,  is an alternative hip hop artist.

History
He first emerged as part of Ice-T's Rhyme Syndicate. His first LP, Word Power, was hailed by critics and fans, but was not a commercial success. His second album, the wildly experimental Spiral Walls Containing Autumns of Light, also failed to sell well. In 1998, Divine Styler hooked up with the Quannum Records crew, teaming up with his dear friend and fellow Rhyme Syndicate alumni Everlast, Styles of Beyond, and the Beat Junkies. The latter also appeared on his third LP, Wordpower, Vol. 2: Directrix (Featuring Exceed), which trafficked in information-age paranoia. Although he did not bask in much commercial success he is a well respected factor from the early 1990s West Coast Underground scene. His poetical approach and unorthodox dance crew "The Scheme Team" influenced the likes of Abstract Rude Tribe Unique (ATU). Although there is not much footage of Divine Styler and the Scheme Team he did make a live appearance on Rapmania, an historic 1989 televised concert that included almost every active Hip Hop artist of that year. Divine performed "Tongue Of Labyrinth" an abstract rhyme style accompanied with the wild dance style of the Scheme Team was a great audio visual performance that captured the essence of Divine Styler.

Divine Styler is a convert to Islam; he influenced the decision of Everlast to become a Muslim. Many of the songs on Spiral Walls Containing Autums of Light are songs of praise to Allah, and the 1999 song "Make it Plain" (recorded for the Funky Precedent compilation) details the joy he feels at having finally found a way of life he loves after decades of uncertainty and woes.

Aside from those major albums his tracks are scattered among other artists' albums and projects. He has done several tracks with John Tejada but they're scattered on several compilations and albums by Tejada. He appeared (along with Sadat X and Cockni O'Dire) on several tracks on the final House of Pain album Truth Crushed to Earth Shall Rise Again. His most recent work has been with Len, Swollen Members, and DJ Shadow, as well as with guitarist, bassist, and emcee Gabe Rosales.

Discography
Albums
 Word Power (1989)
 Spiral Walls Containing Autumns of Light (1992, Giant)
 Word Power, Vol. 2: Directrix (1999, DTX Recordings)
 Def Mask (2014, Gamma Proforma)
EPs
 Ain't Saying Nothing (1988)
Mixtapes 
 Warporn (w/ Everlast & Sick Jacken) (2017, Datpiff)
Singles
 "Architectonic" (2014, Gamma Proforma)

Appears on
 Truth Crushed to Earth Shall Rise Again (1996)
 Strength Magazine Presents Subtext (1999)
 The Funky Precedent (1999)
 Hell's Kitchen (2000)
 Razor Tag (2007)
 Reseda Beach (2012)

Miscellenea
 Sometimes credited as Islamic convert name, Mikal Safiyullah.
 His first few verses from "Whats That Smell" on House of Pain's Truth Crushed To Earth Shall Rise Again is from his first single, "Ain't Sayin' Nothin'", additionally, House of Pain used the same horn squeal from "Ain't Sayin' Nothin'" on their song "Jump Around".
Was a featured artist as a part of the 2013 London-based "Futurism 2.0" exhibit. Divine Styler is also responsible for contributing to the advancement of the futurism movement via musical contribution and advanced iPhonography works.
Inspired an underground 'zine called "insearchof... Divine Styler," which was published from 1996-2001 in London, Ontario, Canada and Toronto, Ontario, Canada.

References

External links
Discography

Musicians from Brooklyn
1968 births
Living people
Giant Records (Warner) artists
Epic Records artists
African-American Muslims
African-American male rappers
Converts to Islam
21st-century American rappers
21st-century American male musicians
21st-century African-American musicians
20th-century African-American people